Ring structure may refer to:

 Chiastic structure, a literary technique
 Heterocyclic compound, a chemical structure
 Ring (mathematics), an algebraic structure

See also
 Ring (disambiguation)